Alija Solak or Aleja Solak (born 1944) is a Bosnian retired footballer who played in the National Soccer League, and the North American Soccer League.

Playing career 
Solak began playing football in 1963 with FK Famos Hrasnica in the Yugoslav Second League. In 1969, he arrived to Canada and was recruited by Toronto Croatia to play in the National Soccer League from 1970 till 1974. In his debut season with Toronto he finished as the club's top goal scorer with 23 goals. In 1971, he assisted Croatia in winning the Canadian Open Cup by recording a goal against Vancouver Eintracht. Throughout his tenure with Toronto he won the NSL Championship in 1971, and 1974.

After Croatia joined the North American Soccer League as the Toronto Metros-Croatia in 1975 he appeared in six matches and recorded one goal. He made his debut on May 23, 1975 against Philadelphia Atoms. He also played in the Kitchener and District Soccer League.

International career 
Solak was called to the Canada men's national soccer team camp by head coach Frank Pike in 1973. He was selected for the Canadian select team in a match against Arsenal F.C.

References 

1944 births
Living people
Association football forwards
Yugoslav footballers
FK Famos Hrasnica players
Toronto Croatia players
Toronto Blizzard (1971–1984) players
Canadian National Soccer League players
North American Soccer League (1968–1984) players
Yugoslav expatriate footballers
Expatriate soccer players in Canada
Yugoslav expatriate sportspeople in Canada